The Hochwang is a mountain of the Plessur Alps, located between the valleys of Schanfigg and Prättigau in the canton of Graubünden. With a height of 2,534 metres above sea level, it is the highest summit of the chain lying west of Durannapass. Several trails lead to its summit. The closest locality is Castiel.

References

External links
 Hochwang on Hikr

Mountains of the Alps
Mountains of Switzerland
Mountains of Graubünden
Two-thousanders of Switzerland